Ivanovsky (masculine), Ivanovskaya (feminine), or Ivanovskoye (neuter), is the name of several rural localities in Russia.

Modern inhabited localities

Amur Oblast
As of 2010, two rural localities in Amur Oblast bear this name:
Ivanovsky, Amur Oblast, a settlement in Maysky Rural Settlement of Mazanovsky District
Ivanovskoye, Amur Oblast, a selo in Ivanovsky Rural Settlement of Selemdzhinsky District

Arkhangelsk Oblast
As of 2010, ten rural localities in Arkhangelsk Oblast bear this name:
Ivanovskoye, Arkhangelsk Oblast, a selo in Verkhopadengsky Selsoviet of Shenkursky District
Ivanovskaya, Koryazhemsky Selsoviet, Kotlassky District, Arkhangelsk Oblast, a village in Koryazhemsky Selsoviet of Kotlassky District
Ivanovskaya, Zabelinsky Selsoviet, Kotlassky District, Arkhangelsk Oblast, a village in Zabelinsky Selsoviet of Kotlassky District
Ivanovskaya, Krasnoborsky District, Arkhangelsk Oblast, a village in Verkhneuftyugsky Selsoviet of Krasnoborsky District
Ivanovskaya, Nyandomsky District, Arkhangelsk Oblast, a village in Limsky Selsoviet of Nyandomsky District
Ivanovskaya, Plesetsky District, Arkhangelsk Oblast, a village in Kenoretsky Selsoviet of Plesetsky District
Ivanovskaya, Nikolsky Selsoviet, Shenkursky District, Arkhangelsk Oblast, a village in Nikolsky Selsoviet of Shenkursky District
Ivanovskaya, Tarnyansky Selsoviet, Shenkursky District, Arkhangelsk Oblast, a village in Tarnyansky Selsoviet of Shenkursky District
Ivanovskaya, Velsky District, Arkhangelsk Oblast, a village in Sudromsky Selsoviet of Velsky District
Ivanovskaya, Vilegodsky District, Arkhangelsk Oblast, a village in Selyansky Selsoviet of Vilegodsky District

Astrakhan Oblast
As of 2010, one rural locality in Astrakhan Oblast bears this name:
Ivanovsky, Astrakhan Oblast, a settlement in Nachalovsky Selsoviet of Privolzhsky District

Republic of Bashkortostan
As of 2010, one rural locality in the Republic of Bashkortostan bears this name:
Ivanovsky, Republic of Bashkortostan, a settlement in Novocherkassky Selsoviet of the city of republic significance of Ufa

Bryansk Oblast
As of 2010, three rural localities in Bryansk Oblast bear this name:
Ivanovsky, Komarichsky District, Bryansk Oblast, a settlement in Arkinsky Selsoviet of Komarichsky District
Ivanovsky, Sevsky District, Bryansk Oblast, a settlement in Nekislitsky Selsoviet of Sevsky District
Ivanovsky, Vygonichsky District, Bryansk Oblast, a settlement in Sosnovobolotsky Selsoviet of Vygonichsky District

Chelyabinsk Oblast
As of 2010, one rural locality in Chelyabinsk Oblast bears this name:
Ivanovsky, Chelyabinsk Oblast, a settlement in Spassky Selsoviet of Verkhneuralsky District

Irkutsk Oblast
As of 2010, one rural locality in Irkutsk Oblast bears this name:
Ivanovsky, Irkutsk Oblast, an area in Kuytunsky District

Ivanovo Oblast
As of 2010, one rural locality in Ivanovo Oblast bears this name:
Ivanovskoye, Ivanovo Oblast, a selo in Privolzhsky District

Kaluga Oblast
As of 2010, nine rural localities in Kaluga Oblast bear this name:
Ivanovsky, Kaluga Oblast, a settlement in Kirovsky District
Ivanovskoye (Sovyaki Rural Settlement), Borovsky District, Kaluga Oblast, a village in Borovsky District; municipally, a part of Sovyaki Rural Settlement of that district
Ivanovskoye (Krivskoye Rural Settlement), Borovsky District, Kaluga Oblast, a village in Borovsky District; municipally, a part of Krivskoye Rural Settlement of that district
Ivanovskoye, Iznoskovsky District, Kaluga Oblast, a village in Iznoskovsky District
Ivanovskoye, Kozelsky District, Kaluga Oblast, a selo in Kozelsky District
Ivanovskoye, Maloyaroslavetsky District, Kaluga Oblast, a village in Maloyaroslavetsky District
Ivanovskoye (Romanovo Rural Settlement), Medynsky District, Kaluga Oblast, a village in Medynsky District; municipally, a part of Romanovo Rural Settlement of that district
Ivanovskoye (Glukhovo Rural Settlement), Medynsky District, Kaluga Oblast, a village in Medynsky District; municipally, a part of Glukhovo Rural Settlement of that district
Ivanovskoye, Zhukovsky District, Kaluga Oblast, a selo in Zhukovsky District

Kirov Oblast
As of 2010, three rural localities in Kirov Oblast bear this name:
Ivanovsky, Kirov Oblast, a pochinok in Buysky Rural Okrug of Urzhumsky District
Ivanovskoye, Kirov Oblast, a selo under the administrative jurisdiction of  the urban-type settlement of Svecha in Svechinsky District
Ivanovskaya, Kirov Oblast, a village in Ichetovkinsky Rural Okrug of Afanasyevsky District

Komi Republic
As of 2010, two rural localities in the Komi Republic bear this name:
Ivanovskaya, Kortkerossky District, Komi Republic, a village in Bolshelug Selo Administrative Territory of Kortkerossky District
Ivanovskaya, Priluzsky District, Komi Republic, a village in Loyma Selo Administrative Territory of Priluzsky District

Kostroma Oblast
As of 2012, eleven rural localities in Kostroma Oblast bear this name:
Ivanovsky, Kostroma Oblast, a khutor in Shangskoye Settlement of Sharyinsky District
Ivanovskoye, Buysky District, Kostroma Oblast, a village in Tsentralnoye Settlement of Buysky District
Ivanovskoye, Chukhlomsky District, Kostroma Oblast, a village in Nozhkinskoye Settlement of Chukhlomsky District
Ivanovskoye, Krasnoselsky District, Kostroma Oblast, a village in Chapayevskoye Settlement of Krasnoselsky District
Ivanovskoye, Knyazhevskoye Settlement, Makaryevsky District, Kostroma Oblast, a village in Knyazhevskoye Settlement of Makaryevsky District
Ivanovskoye, Shemyatinskoye Settlement, Makaryevsky District, Kostroma Oblast, a village in Shemyatinskoye Settlement of Makaryevsky District
Ivanovskoye, Manturovsky District, Kostroma Oblast, a village in Rogovskoye Settlement of Manturovsky District
Ivanovskoye, Mezhevskoy District, Kostroma Oblast, a village in Georgiyevskoye Settlement of Mezhevskoy District
Ivanovskoye, Nerekhtsky District, Kostroma Oblast, a selo in Yemsnenskoye Settlement of Nerekhtsky District
Ivanovskoye, Neysky District, Kostroma Oblast, a village in Vozherovskoye Settlement of Neysky District
Ivanovskoye, Sharyinsky District, Kostroma Oblast, a village in Ivanovskoye Settlement of Sharyinsky District

Krasnodar Krai
As of 2010, two rural localities in Krasnodar Krai bear this name:
Ivanovsky, Krasnodar Krai, a khutor in Verkhnekubansky Rural Okrug of Novokubansky District
Ivanovskaya, Krasnodar Krai, a stanitsa in Ivanovsky Rural Okrug of Krasnoarmeysky District

Kursk Oblast
As of 2010, five rural localities in Kursk Oblast bear this name:
Ivanovsky, Belovsky District, Kursk Oblast, a khutor in Bobravsky Selsoviet of Belovsky District
Ivanovsky, Dmitriyevsky District, Kursk Oblast, a settlement in Melovsky Selsoviet of Dmitriyevsky District
Ivanovsky, Fatezhsky District, Kursk Oblast, a khutor in Kolychevsky Selsoviet of Fatezhsky District
Ivanovsky, Zheleznogorsky District, Kursk Oblast, a settlement in Volkovsky Selsoviet of Zheleznogorsky District
Ivanovskoye, Kursk Oblast, a selo in Ivanovsky Selsoviet of Rylsky District

Leningrad Oblast
As of 2010, seven rural localities in Leningrad Oblast bear this name:
Ivanovskoye, Boksitogorsky District, Leningrad Oblast, a village in Zaboryevskoye Settlement Municipal Formation of Boksitogorsky District
Ivanovskoye, Kingiseppsky District, Leningrad Oblast, a logging depot settlement in Pustomerzhskoye Settlement Municipal Formation of Kingiseppsky District
Ivanovskoye, Lomonosovsky District, Leningrad Oblast, a village in Koporskoye Settlement Municipal Formation of Lomonosovsky District
Ivanovskoye, Luzhsky District, Leningrad Oblast, a village in Volodarskoye Settlement Municipal Formation of Luzhsky District
Ivanovskoye, Tikhvinsky District, Leningrad Oblast, a village in Shugozerskoye Settlement Municipal Formation of Tikhvinsky District
Ivanovskoye, Tosnensky District, Leningrad Oblast, a village under the administrative jurisdiction of Lyubanskoye Settlement Municipal Formation of Tosnensky District
Ivanovskoye, Volosovsky District, Leningrad Oblast, a village in Begunitskoye Settlement Municipal Formation of Volosovsky District

Moscow Oblast
As of 2010, twenty-one rural localities in Moscow Oblast bear this name:
Ivanovskoye, Chernogolovka, Moscow Oblast, a selo under the administrative jurisdiction of the Chernogolovka City Under Oblast Jurisdiction
Ivanovskoye, Chekhovsky District, Moscow Oblast, a selo in Stremilovskoye Rural Settlement of Chekhovsky District
Ivanovskoye, Bolsherogachevskoye Rural Settlement, Dmitrovsky District, Moscow Oblast, a selo in Bolsherogachevskoye Rural Settlement of Dmitrovsky District
Ivanovskoye, Kostinskoye Rural Settlement, Dmitrovsky District, Moscow Oblast, a village in Kostinskoye Rural Settlement of Dmitrovsky District
Ivanovskoye, Ivanovskoye Rural Settlement, Istrinsky District, Moscow Oblast, a village in Ivanovskoye Rural Settlement of Istrinsky District
Ivanovskoye, Pavlo-Slobodskoye Rural Settlement, Istrinsky District, Moscow Oblast, a village in Pavlo-Slobodskoye Rural Settlement of Istrinsky District
Ivanovskoye, Yermolinskoye Rural Settlement, Istrinsky District, Moscow Oblast, a village in Yermolinskoye Rural Settlement of Istrinsky District
Ivanovskoye, Nudolskoye Rural Settlement, Klinsky District, Moscow Oblast, a selo in Nudolskoye Rural Settlement of Klinsky District
Ivanovskoye, Petrovskoye Rural Settlement, Klinsky District, Moscow Oblast, a village in Petrovskoye Rural Settlement of Klinsky District
Ivanovskoye, Krasnogorsky District, Moscow Oblast, a village under the administrative jurisdiction of the Town of Krasnogorsk in Krasnogorsky District
Ivanovskoye, Lotoshinsky District, Moscow Oblast, a village under the administrative jurisdiction of the work settlement of Lotoshino in Lotoshinsky District
Ivanovskoye, Naro-Fominsky District, Moscow Oblast, a village in Pervomayskoye Rural Settlement of Naro-Fominsky District
Ivanovskoye, Serpukhovsky District, Moscow Oblast, a village in Vasilyevskoye Rural Settlement of Serpukhovsky District
Ivanovskoye, Shakhovskoy District, Moscow Oblast, a village in Stepankovskoye Rural Settlement of Shakhovskoy District
Ivanovskoye, Semenovskoye Rural Settlement, Stupinsky District, Moscow Oblast, a selo in Semenovskoye Rural Settlement of Stupinsky District
Ivanovskoye, Zhilyovo, Stupinsky District, Moscow Oblast, a village under the administrative jurisdiction of the work settlement of Zhilyovo in Stupinsky District
Ivanovskoye, Spasskoye Rural Settlement, Volokolamsky District, Moscow Oblast, a village in Spasskoye Rural Settlement of Volokolamsky District
Ivanovskoye, Volokolamsk, Volokolamsky District, Moscow Oblast, a selo under the administrative jurisdiction of the Town of Volokolamsk in Volokolamsky District
Ivanovskaya, Dmitrovskoye Rural Settlement, Shatursky District, Moscow Oblast, a village in Dmitrovskoye Rural Settlement of Shatursky District
Ivanovskaya, Krivandinskoye Rural Settlement, Shatursky District, Moscow Oblast, a village in Krivandinskoye Rural Settlement of Shatursky District
Ivanovskaya, Yegoryevsky District, Moscow Oblast, a village under the administrative jurisdiction of the Town of Yegoryevsk in Yegoryevsky District

Nizhny Novgorod Oblast
As of 2010, eleven rural localities in Nizhny Novgorod Oblast bear this name:
Ivanovsky, Nizhny Novgorod Oblast, a settlement in Ilyino-Zaborsky Selsoviet of the town of oblast significance of Semyonov
Ivanovskoye, Krasnoslobodsky Selsoviet, Bor, Nizhny Novgorod Oblast, a village in Krasnoslobodsky Selsoviet of the city of oblast significance of Bor
Ivanovskoye, Lindovsky Selsoviet, Bor, Nizhny Novgorod Oblast, a village in Lindovsky Selsoviet of the city of oblast significance of Bor
Ivanovskoye, Yamnovsky Selsoviet, Bor, Nizhny Novgorod Oblast, a selo in Yamnovsky Selsoviet of the city of oblast significance of Bor
Ivanovskoye, Semyonov, Nizhny Novgorod Oblast, a village in Ivanovsky Selsoviet of the town of oblast significance of Semyonov
Ivanovskoye, Shakhunya, Nizhny Novgorod Oblast, a village in Khmelevitsky Selsoviet of the town of oblast significance of Shakhunya
Ivanovskoye, Bogorodsky District, Nizhny Novgorod Oblast, a selo in Khvoshchevsky Selsoviet of Bogorodsky District
Ivanovskoye, Bolshemurashkinsky District, Nizhny Novgorod Oblast, a selo in Kholyazinsky Selsoviet of Bolshemurashkinsky District
Ivanovskoye, Diveyevsky District, Nizhny Novgorod Oblast, a selo in Ivanovsky Selsoviet of Diveyevsky District
Ivanovskoye, Krasnobakovsky District, Nizhny Novgorod Oblast, a village in Prudovsky Selsoviet of Krasnobakovsky District
Ivanovskoye, Spassky District, Nizhny Novgorod Oblast, a selo in Krasnovatrassky Selsoviet of Spassky District

Novgorod Oblast
As of 2010, five rural localities in Novgorod Oblast bear this name:
Ivanovskoye, Kholmsky District, Novgorod Oblast, a village in Morkhovskoye Settlement of Kholmsky District
Ivanovskoye, Lyubytinsky District, Novgorod Oblast, a village under the administrative jurisdiction of the urban-type settlement of Nebolchi in Lyubytinsky District
Ivanovskoye, Moshenskoy District, Novgorod Oblast, a village in Orekhovskoye Settlement of Moshenskoy District
Ivanovskoye, Pestovsky District, Novgorod Oblast, a village in Pestovskoye Settlement of Pestovsky District
Ivanovskoye, Starorussky District, Novgorod Oblast, a village in Ivanovskoye Settlement of Starorussky District

Oryol Oblast
As of 2010, eight rural localities in Oryol Oblast bear this name:
Ivanovsky, Bolkhovsky District, Oryol Oblast, a settlement in Borovskoy Selsoviet of Bolkhovsky District
Ivanovsky, Dmitrovsky District, Oryol Oblast, a settlement in Malobobrovsky Selsoviet of Dmitrovsky District
Ivanovsky, Kromskoy District, Oryol Oblast, a settlement in Kutafinsky Selsoviet of Kromskoy District
Ivanovsky, Mtsensky District, Oryol Oblast, a settlement in Anikanovsky Selsoviet of Mtsensky District
Ivanovsky, Orlovsky District, Oryol Oblast, a settlement in Zhilyayevsky Selsoviet of Orlovsky District
Ivanovsky, Znamensky District, Oryol Oblast, a settlement in Selikhovsky Selsoviet of Znamensky District
Ivanovskoye, Orlovsky District, Oryol Oblast, a village in Stanovskoy Selsoviet of Orlovsky District
Ivanovskoye, Znamensky District, Oryol Oblast, a village in Znamensky Selsoviet of Znamensky District

Penza Oblast
As of 2010, one rural locality in Penza Oblast bears this name:
Ivanovsky, Penza Oblast, a settlement in Kirovsky Selsoviet of Serdobsky District

Perm Krai
As of 2010, two rural localities in Perm Krai bear this name:
Ivanovskoye, Perm Krai, a selo in Ilyinsky District
Ivanovskaya, Perm Krai, a village in Yurlinsky District

Pskov Oblast
As of 2010, one rural locality in Pskov Oblast bears this name:
Ivanovskoye, Pskov Oblast, a village in Plyussky District

Rostov Oblast
As of 2010, two rural localities in Rostov Oblast bear this name:
Ivanovsky, Milyutinsky District, Rostov Oblast, a khutor in Nikolo-Berezovskoye Rural Settlement of Milyutinsky District
Ivanovsky, Zimovnikovsky District, Rostov Oblast, a khutor in Severnoye Rural Settlement of Zimovnikovsky District

Ryazan Oblast
As of 2010, one rural locality in Ryazan Oblast bears this name:
Ivanovskoye, Ryazan Oblast, a selo in Ivanovsky Rural Okrug of Starozhilovsky District

Saratov Oblast
As of 2010, two rural localities in Saratov Oblast bear this name:
Ivanovsky, Ozinsky District, Saratov Oblast, a khutor in Ozinsky District
Ivanovsky, Saratovsky District, Saratov Oblast, a settlement in Saratovsky District

Smolensk Oblast
As of 2010, eight rural localities in Smolensk Oblast bear this name:
Ivanovskoye, Dorogobuzhsky District, Smolensk Oblast, a village in Frunzenskoye Rural Settlement of Dorogobuzhsky District
Ivanovskoye, Gagarinsky District, Smolensk Oblast, a village in Tokarevskoye Rural Settlement of Gagarinsky District
Ivanovskoye, Dneprovskoye Rural Settlement, Novoduginsky District, Smolensk Oblast, a village in Dneprovskoye Rural Settlement of Novoduginsky District
Ivanovskoye, Izvekovskoye Rural Settlement, Novoduginsky District, Smolensk Oblast, a village in Izvekovskoye Rural Settlement of Novoduginsky District
Ivanovskoye, Pochinkovsky District, Smolensk Oblast, a village in Ivanovskoye Rural Settlement of Pochinkovsky District
Ivanovskoye, Astapkovichskoye Rural Settlement, Roslavlsky District, Smolensk Oblast, a village in Astapkovichskoye Rural Settlement of Roslavlsky District
Ivanovskoye, Ivanovskoye Rural Settlement, Roslavlsky District, Smolensk Oblast, a village in Ivanovskoye Rural Settlement of Roslavlsky District
Ivanovskoye, Tyomkinsky District, Smolensk Oblast, a village in Medvedevskoye Rural Settlement of Tyomkinsky District

Stavropol Krai
As of 2010, one rural locality in Stavropol Krai bears this name:
Ivanovskoye, Stavropol Krai, a selo in Ivanovsky Selsoviet of Kochubeyevsky District

Tambov Oblast
As of 2010, one rural locality in Tambov Oblast bears this name:
Ivanovsky, Tambov Oblast, a settlement in Mitropolsky Selsoviet of Bondarsky District

Republic of Tatarstan
As of 2010, three rural localities in the Republic of Tatarstan bear this name:
Ivanovsky, Republic of Tatarstan, a settlement in Alexeyevsky District
Ivanovskoye, Verkhneuslonsky District, Republic of Tatarstan, a settlement in Verkhneuslonsky District
Ivanovskoye, Zelenodolsky District, Republic of Tatarstan, a village in Zelenodolsky District

Tula Oblast
As of 2010, seven rural localities in Tula Oblast bear this name:
Ivanovsky, Tula Oblast, a settlement in Yazykovsky Rural Okrug of Kamensky District
Ivanovskoye, Arsenyevsky District, Tula Oblast, a selo in Astapovsky Rural Okrug of Arsenyevsky District
Ivanovskoye, Kimovsky District, Tula Oblast, a selo in Pokrovsky Rural Okrug of Kimovsky District
Ivanovskoye, Plavsky District, Tula Oblast, a village in Meshcherinsky Rural Okrug of Plavsky District
Ivanovskoye, Tyoplo-Ogaryovsky District, Tula Oblast, a selo in Ivanovsky Rural Okrug of Tyoplo-Ogaryovsky District
Ivanovskoye, Venyovsky District, Tula Oblast, a village in Belkovsky Rural Okrug of Venyovsky District
Ivanovskoye, Zaoksky District, Tula Oblast, a village in Dmitriyevsky Rural Okrug of Zaoksky District

Tver Oblast
As of 2010, fifteen rural localities in Tver Oblast bear this name:
Ivanovskoye, Bezhetsky District, Tver Oblast, a village in Bezhetsky District
Ivanovskoye (Mednovskoye Rural Settlement), Kalininsky District, Tver Oblast, a village in Kalininsky District; municipally, a part of Mednovskoye Rural Settlement of that district
Ivanovskoye (Kulitskoye Rural Settlement), Kalininsky District, Tver Oblast, a village in Kalininsky District; municipally, a part of Kulitskoye Rural Settlement of that district
Ivanovskoye, Konakovsky District, Tver Oblast, a village in Konakovsky District
Ivanovskoye, Maksatikhinsky District, Tver Oblast, a village in Maksatikhinsky District
Ivanovskoye, Ostashkovsky District, Tver Oblast, a village in Ostashkovsky District
Ivanovskoye, Rameshkovsky District, Tver Oblast, a selo in Rameshkovsky District
Ivanovskoye, Rzhevsky District, Tver Oblast, a village in Rzhevsky District
Ivanovskoye, Sonkovsky District, Tver Oblast, two villages in Sonkovsky District
Ivanovskoye (selo), Staritsky District, Tver Oblast, a selo in Staritsky District
Ivanovskoye (village), Staritsky District, Tver Oblast, a village in Staritsky District
Ivanovskoye, Toropetsky District, Tver Oblast, a village in Toropetsky District
Ivanovskoye, Udomelsky District, Tver Oblast, a village in Udomelsky District
Ivanovskoye, Zubtsovsky District, Tver Oblast, a village in Zubtsovsky District

Ulyanovsk Oblast
As of 2010, one rural locality in Ulyanovsk Oblast bears this name:
Ivanovsky, Ulyanovsk Oblast, a settlement in Ureno-Karlinsky Rural Okrug of Karsunsky District

Vladimir Oblast
As of 2010, five rural localities in Vladimir Oblast bear this name:
Ivanovskoye (Karinskoye Rural Settlement), Alexandrovsky District, Vladimir Oblast, a village in Alexandrovsky District; municipally, a part of Karinskoye Rural Settlement of that district
Ivanovskoye (Andreyevskoye Rural Settlement), Alexandrovsky District, Vladimir Oblast, a village in Alexandrovsky District; municipally, a part of Andreyevskoye Rural Settlement of that district
Ivanovskoye, Suzdalsky District, Vladimir Oblast, a selo in Suzdalsky District
Ivanovskaya, Kameshkovsky District, Vladimir Oblast, a village in Kameshkovsky District
Ivanovskaya, Selivanovsky District, Vladimir Oblast, a village in Selivanovsky District

Volgograd Oblast
As of 2010, two rural localities in Volgograd Oblast bear this name:
Ivanovsky, Panfilovsky Selsoviet, Novoanninsky District, Volgograd Oblast, a khutor in Panfilovsky Selsoviet of Novoanninsky District

Vologda Oblast
As of 2010, thirty-one rural localities in Vologda Oblast bear this name:
Ivanovsky, Vologda Oblast, a settlement in Sholsky Selsoviet of Belozersky District
Ivanovskoye, Belozersky District, Vologda Oblast, a selo in Georgiyevsky Selsoviet of Belozersky District
Ivanovskoye, Cherepovetsky District, Vologda Oblast, a selo in Ivanovsky Selsoviet of Cherepovetsky District
Ivanovskoye, Kaduysky District, Vologda Oblast, a village in Nikolsky Selsoviet of Kaduysky District
Ivanovskoye, Kharovsky District, Vologda Oblast, a village in Kharovsky Selsoviet of Kharovsky District
Ivanovskoye, Kirillovsky District, Vologda Oblast, a village in Ferapontovsky Selsoviet of Kirillovsky District
Ivanovskoye, Sokolsky District, Vologda Oblast, a village in Pelshemsky Selsoviet of Sokolsky District
Ivanovskoye, Tomashsky Selsoviet, Ust-Kubinsky District, Vologda Oblast, a village in Tomashsky Selsoviet of Ust-Kubinsky District
Ivanovskoye, Ustyansky Selsoviet, Ust-Kubinsky District, Vologda Oblast, a village in Ustyansky Selsoviet of Ust-Kubinsky District
Ivanovskoye, Zadneselsky Selsoviet, Ust-Kubinsky District, Vologda Oblast, a village in Zadneselsky Selsoviet of Ust-Kubinsky District
Ivanovskoye, Ustyuzhensky District, Vologda Oblast, a village in Nikiforovsky Selsoviet of Ustyuzhensky District
Ivanovskoye, Kubensky Selsoviet, Vologodsky District, Vologda Oblast, a village in Kubensky Selsoviet of Vologodsky District
Ivanovskoye, Markovsky Selsoviet, Vologodsky District, Vologda Oblast, a village in Markovsky Selsoviet of Vologodsky District
Ivanovskoye, Spassky Selsoviet, Vologodsky District, Vologda Oblast, a village in Spassky Selsoviet of Vologodsky District
Ivanovskoye, Veprevsky Selsoviet, Vologodsky District, Vologda Oblast, a village in Veprevsky Selsoviet of Vologodsky District
Ivanovskaya, Babayevsky District, Vologda Oblast, a village in Novostarinsky Selsoviet of Babayevsky District
Ivanovskaya, Belozersky District, Vologda Oblast, a village in Georgiyevsky Selsoviet of Belozersky District
Ivanovskaya, Kharovsky District, Vologda Oblast, a village in Ilyinsky Selsoviet of Kharovsky District
Ivanovskaya, Nyuksensky District, Vologda Oblast, a village in Uftyugsky Selsoviet of Nyuksensky District
Ivanovskaya, Syamzhensky District, Vologda Oblast, a village in Noginsky Selsoviet of Syamzhensky District
Ivanovskaya, Tarnogsky District, Vologda Oblast, a village in Ilezsky Selsoviet of Tarnogsky District
Ivanovskaya, Totemsky District, Vologda Oblast, a village in Vozhbalsky Selsoviet of Totemsky District
Ivanovskaya, Ust-Kubinsky District, Vologda Oblast, a village in Troitsky Selsoviet of Ust-Kubinsky District
Ivanovskaya, Vashkinsky District, Vologda Oblast, a village in Ivanovsky Selsoviet of Vashkinsky District
Ivanovskaya, Klimushinsky Selsoviet, Verkhovazhsky District, Vologda Oblast, a village in Klimushinsky Selsoviet of Verkhovazhsky District
Ivanovskaya, Lipetsky Selsoviet, Verkhovazhsky District, Vologda Oblast, a village in Lipetsky Selsoviet of Verkhovazhsky District
Ivanovskaya, Sibirsky Selsoviet, Verkhovazhsky District, Vologda Oblast, a village in Sibirsky Selsoviet of Verkhovazhsky District
Ivanovskaya, Mishutinsky Selsoviet, Vozhegodsky District, Vologda Oblast, a village in Mishutinsky Selsoviet of Vozhegodsky District
Ivanovskaya, Vozhegodsky Selsoviet, Vozhegodsky District, Vologda Oblast, a village in Vozhegodsky Selsoviet of Vozhegodsky District
Ivanovskaya, Yuchkinsky Selsoviet, Vozhegodsky District, Vologda Oblast, a village in Yuchkinsky Selsoviet of Vozhegodsky District
Ivanovskaya, Vytegorsky District, Vologda Oblast, a village in Semenovsky Selsoviet of Vytegorsky District

Voronezh Oblast
As of 2010, one rural locality in Voronezh Oblast bears this name:
Ivanovsky, Voronezh Oblast, a khutor in Petropavlovskoye Rural Settlement of Ostrogozhsky District

Yaroslavl Oblast
As of 2010, forty-one rural localities in Yaroslavl Oblast bear this name:
Ivanovskoye, Blagoveshchensky Rural Okrug, Bolsheselsky District, Yaroslavl Oblast, a village in Blagoveshchensky Rural Okrug of Bolsheselsky District
Ivanovskoye, Chudinovsky Rural Okrug, Bolsheselsky District, Yaroslavl Oblast, a village in Chudinovsky Rural Okrug of Bolsheselsky District
Ivanovskoye, Markovsky Rural Okrug, Bolsheselsky District, Yaroslavl Oblast, a village in Markovsky Rural Okrug of Bolsheselsky District
Ivanovskoye, Markovsky Rural Okrug, Bolsheselsky District, Yaroslavl Oblast, a village in Markovsky Rural Okrug of Bolsheselsky District
Ivanovskoye, Borisoglebsky District, Yaroslavl Oblast, a selo in Davydovsky Rural Okrug of Borisoglebsky District
Ivanovskoye, Breytovsky District, Yaroslavl Oblast, a village in Sevastyantsevsky Rural Okrug of Breytovsky District
Ivanovskoye, Danilovsky Rural Okrug, Danilovsky District, Yaroslavl Oblast, a village in Danilovsky Rural Okrug of Danilovsky District
Ivanovskoye, Pokrovsky Rural Okrug, Danilovsky District, Yaroslavl Oblast, a village in Pokrovsky Rural Okrug of Danilovsky District
Ivanovskoye, Ryzhikovsky Rural Okrug, Danilovsky District, Yaroslavl Oblast, a village in Ryzhikovsky Rural Okrug of Danilovsky District
Ivanovskoye, Semlovsky Rural Okrug, Danilovsky District, Yaroslavl Oblast, a village in Semlovsky Rural Okrug of Danilovsky District
Ivanovskoye, Osetsky Rural Okrug, Lyubimsky District, Yaroslavl Oblast, a village in Osetsky Rural Okrug of Lyubimsky District
Ivanovskoye, Voskresensky Rural Okrug, Lyubimsky District, Yaroslavl Oblast, a village in Voskresensky Rural Okrug of Lyubimsky District
Ivanovskoye, Myshkinsky District, Yaroslavl Oblast, a selo in Povodnevsky Rural Okrug of Myshkinsky District
Ivanovskoye, Novinsky Rural Okrug, Nekouzsky District, Yaroslavl Oblast, a village in Novinsky Rural Okrug of Nekouzsky District
Ivanovskoye, Rozhalovsky Rural Okrug, Nekouzsky District, Yaroslavl Oblast, a village in Rozhalovsky Rural Okrug of Nekouzsky District
Ivanovskoye, Borovskoy Rural Okrug, Nekrasovsky District, Yaroslavl Oblast, a village in Borovskoy Rural Okrug of Nekrasovsky District
Ivanovskoye, Nikolsky Rural Okrug, Nekrasovsky District, Yaroslavl Oblast, a village in Nikolsky Rural Okrug of Nekrasovsky District
Ivanovskoye, Perelessky Rural Okrug, Pereslavsky District, Yaroslavl Oblast, a settlement in Perelessky Rural Okrug of Pereslavsky District
Ivanovskoye, Ponomarevsky Rural Okrug, Pereslavsky District, Yaroslavl Oblast, a selo in Ponomarevsky Rural Okrug of Pereslavsky District
Ivanovskoye, Kukoboysky Rural Okrug, Pervomaysky District, Yaroslavl Oblast, a village in Kukoboysky Rural Okrug of Pervomaysky District
Ivanovskoye, Prechistensky Rural Okrug, Pervomaysky District, Yaroslavl Oblast, a village in Prechistensky Rural Okrug of Pervomaysky District
Ivanovskoye, Uritsky Rural Okrug, Pervomaysky District, Yaroslavl Oblast, a village in Uritsky Rural Okrug of Pervomaysky District
Ivanovskoye, Kolodinsky Rural Okrug, Poshekhonsky District, Yaroslavl Oblast, a village in Kolodinsky Rural Okrug of Poshekhonsky District
Ivanovskoye, Sverdlovsky Rural Okrug, Poshekhonsky District, Yaroslavl Oblast, a village in Sverdlovsky Rural Okrug of Poshekhonsky District
Ivanovskoye, Rostovsky District, Yaroslavl Oblast, a village in Shugorsky Rural Okrug of Rostovsky District
Ivanovskoye, Arefinsky Rural Okrug, Rybinsky District, Yaroslavl Oblast, a village in Arefinsky Rural Okrug of Rybinsky District
Ivanovskoye, Arefinsky Rural Okrug, Rybinsky District, Yaroslavl Oblast, a village in Arefinsky Rural Okrug of Rybinsky District
Ivanovskoye, Arefinsky Rural Okrug, Rybinsky District, Yaroslavl Oblast, a village in Arefinsky Rural Okrug of Rybinsky District
Ivanovskoye, Glebovsky Rural Okrug, Rybinsky District, Yaroslavl Oblast, a selo in Glebovsky Rural Okrug of Rybinsky District
Ivanovskoye, Mikhaylovsky Rural Okrug, Rybinsky District, Yaroslavl Oblast, a village in Mikhaylovsky Rural Okrug of Rybinsky District
Ivanovskoye, Nazarovsky Rural Okrug, Rybinsky District, Yaroslavl Oblast, a village in Nazarovsky Rural Okrug of Rybinsky District
Ivanovskoye, Ogarkovsky Rural Okrug, Rybinsky District, Yaroslavl Oblast, a village in Ogarkovsky Rural Okrug of Rybinsky District
Ivanovskoye, Pokrovsky Rural Okrug, Rybinsky District, Yaroslavl Oblast, a village in Pokrovsky Rural Okrug of Rybinsky District
Ivanovskoye, Shashkovsky Rural Okrug, Rybinsky District, Yaroslavl Oblast, a village in Shashkovsky Rural Okrug of Rybinsky District
Ivanovskoye, Metenininsky Rural Okrug, Tutayevsky District, Yaroslavl Oblast, a village in Metenininsky Rural Okrug of Tutayevsky District
Ivanovskoye, Nikolsky Rural Okrug, Tutayevsky District, Yaroslavl Oblast, a village in Nikolsky Rural Okrug of Tutayevsky District
Ivanovskoye, Pomogalovsky Rural Okrug, Tutayevsky District, Yaroslavl Oblast, a village in Pomogalovsky Rural Okrug of Tutayevsky District
Ivanovskoye, Rodionovsky Rural Okrug, Tutayevsky District, Yaroslavl Oblast, a village in Rodionovsky Rural Okrug of Tutayevsky District
Ivanovskoye, Vasilevsky Rural Okrug, Uglichsky District, Yaroslavl Oblast, a village in Vasilevsky Rural Okrug of Uglichsky District
Ivanovskoye, Vozdvizhensky Rural Okrug, Uglichsky District, Yaroslavl Oblast, a village in Vozdvizhensky Rural Okrug of Uglichsky District
Ivanovskaya, Yaroslavl Oblast, a village in Kryukovsky Rural Okrug of Myshkinsky District

Abolished inhabited localities
Ivanovskoye, Parfenyevsky District, Kostroma Oblast, a village in Savinsky Selsoviet of Parfenyevsky District in Kostroma Oblast; abolished on October 18, 2004
Ivanovskoye, a former urban-type settlement in Leningrad Oblast, which in 1970 was merged with the urban-type settlement of Otradnoye to form the town of Otradnoye
Ivanovsky, Novokiyevsky Selsoviet, Novoanninsky District, Volgograd Oblast, a khutor in Novokiyevsky Selsoviet of Novoanninsky District; abolished before July 2013

References

Notes

Sources